Delareyville is a maize- and peanut-farming town situated in North West Province of South Africa. The town is 96 km south-west of Lichtenburg, 82 km north-east of Vryburg, 114 km north-west of Wolmaransstad, and 61 km north of Schweizer-Reneke.

History
It was laid out in 1914 and declared a border industry area in 1968. It was named after Jacobus Herculaas (Koos) de la Rey (1847-1914), General of the Boer forces in the Anglo-Boer War.

Economy

Agriculture
The area is known for the cultivation of maize, groundnuts, sorghum and sheep and cattle farming.

Mining
Salt is mined from the many pans in the area.

References

Populated places in the Tswaing Local Municipality
Populated places established in 1914